David Crane is a Scottish historian and author.

Crane read history and English at Oxford University before becoming a lecturer at universities in the Netherlands, Japan, and Africa. He lives in northwest Scotland.

He has written two books about Lord Byron and his family; a biography of explorer Robert Falcon Scott; and a book about World War I grave monuments. He has also written a book about The Battle of Waterloo called Went the Day Well? (Witnessing Waterloo).

Awards and honours
2013 Samuel Johnson Prize shortlist for Empires of the Dead
2013 Hessell-Tiltman Prize shortlist for Empires of the Dead

Bibliography
Lord Byron's Jackal: A Life of Trelawny (1999)
 The Kindness of Sisters: Annabella Milbanke and the Destruction of the Byrons (2002), held in 390 libraries according to WorldCat
Scott of the Antarctic: A Life of Courage and Tragedy in the Extreme South (2006)
Empires of the Dead: How One Man's Vision led to the Creation of WWI's World Graves (2013)
 Went the Day Well? (Witnessing Waterloo) (2015)

References

21st-century Scottish historians
Living people
Year of birth missing (living people)
Alumni of the University of Oxford